"Star Walkin' (League of Legends Worlds Anthem)" is a song by American rapper and singer Lil Nas X. It was released as a single through Columbia Records on September 22, 2022. The anthem for 2022 League of Legends World Championship was written by Lil Nas X, Atia "Ink" Boggs and the song's producers, Cirkut and Omer Fedi.

Charts

Weekly charts

Monthly charts

Year-end charts

Certifications

Release history

References

2022 singles
2022 songs
Lil Nas X songs
Songs written by Lil Nas X
Songs written by Omer Fedi
Columbia Records singles
League of Legends
Animated music videos